The MTV Movie Award for Best Musical Moment is an award presented to singers/groups for quality songs in films at the MTV Movie Awards, a ceremony established in 1992. Honors in several categories are awarded by MTV at the annual ceremonies, and are chosen by public votes. 

The MTV Movie Award for Best Song From a Movie was first given out in 1992 for Bryan Adams' "Everything I Do I Do It For You" from Robin Hood: Prince of Thieves. The award was last given out in 1999, and was replaced with Best Musical Sequence in 2000, but made a return in 2009 and retired again. It returned in 2012 renamed as Best Music and retired again before reappearing as Best Musical Sequence before changing in 2017 to its current name.

In 1996, Batman Forever and Waiting to Exhale each had two songs nominated in this category, with the latter winning for "Sittin' Up In My Room". Bryan Adams, Bush and Whitney Houston have each won the Best Song honor from two nominations. Eric Clapton had received three nominations, and Boyz II Men, Céline Dion, Madonna, Bruce Springsteen and Sting have each been nominated twice.

Best Song from a Movie

Best Musical Sequence

Best Musical Moment

References

MTV Movie & TV Awards
Film awards for Best Song